Martín Amarillas (born 20 December 1965) is a Mexican former professional boxer who competed from 1989 to 1995. As an amateur, he competed in the men's middleweight event at the 1988 Summer Olympics.

References

External links
 

1965 births
Living people
Mexican male boxers
Olympic boxers of Mexico
Boxers at the 1988 Summer Olympics
People from Nogales, Sonora
Boxers from Sonora
Middleweight boxers
Mexican emigrants to the United States